Barry Hunter may refer to:

 Barry Hunter (footballer) (born 1968), former Northern Ireland international footballer
 Barry Hunter (bishop) (1927–2015), Anglican Bishop of Riverina, Australia, 1971–1992